Thalia geniculata, the bent alligator-flag, arrowroot, or fire-flag, is a plant species widespread across tropical Africa and much of the Americas.

Thalia geniculata is native to a large region in Africa, from Senegal in the west to Sudan in the east, south to Zimbabwe and Angola. It is also considered native to Mexico, Central America,  the West Indies, most of South America, as well as the southeastern United States (Puerto Rico, Florida, Louisiana, Alabama and southern Georgia).

Ecology
The larvae of Stolidoptera tachasara, Xylophanes hannemanni and Sphenarches anisodactylus have been recorded feeding on Thalia geniculata. The Thalia geniculata was also use to investigate the sugar-feeding behavior of Anopheles quadrimaculatus by measuring the impact and its survival(7)

Chemistry
Rosmarinic acid can be found in plants in the family Marantaceae such as Thalia geniculata.

References

geniculata
Plants described in 1753
Taxa named by Carl Linnaeus
Flora of Mexico
Flora of the Southeastern United States
Flora of South America
Flora of Africa
Edible plants